Magaadu is a 1976 Indian Telugu-language action drama film produced by Lakshmi Rajyam, Sridhar Rao and Srikanth Nahata and directed by S. D. Lal. The film stars N. T. Rama Rao, Ramakrishna, Manjula and Latha, with music composed by K. V. Mahadevan. It is a remake of the Hindi film Deewaar (1975).

Plot 
The film begins with a protest under the strong leadership of trade unionist Anand Babu to enhance the lives of struggling labourers. Anand Babu leads a happy family life with his wife, Shantamma, and two sons, Vijay & Ravi. The factory management tries to bribe him but he does not yield then they show life threat to his family, so, he surrenders to them. Furious, labourers attack him, everyone looks at him as a traitor, so, he leaves the home and roams around aimlessly. Shantamma leaves the town along with children and starts working as a labourer. Vijay also assists her mother to educate his younger brother but Vijay becomes an atheist who never enters into the temple only accompanies his mother & brother and sits at its steps. Years roll by, Vijay works in the harbour as Coolie No. 786 where a worker Rahim advises him not to lose that badge as it is a lucky charm to him. Ravi becomes a graduate, moves to police training and loves the Police Commissioner's daughter Geetha. Parallelly, at the harbour, Vijay revolts against the atrocities made by a gangster Bhujangam. Discerning Vijay, Rambabu, another gangster appoints him as a white knight. Vijay courageously succeeds several tasks and every time his badge 786 shields him. Time passes, Vijay becomes a deadly gangster, gets acquaintance with a club dancer Anitha and they fall in love. Meanwhile, Ravi returns as a police officer, learns the reality and requests his brother to surrender but he refuses, so, Ravi leaves the house along with his mother. After that, an unknown person is found dead in a railway compartment, Ravi recognises him as his father Anand Babu after his funeral, Shantamma becomes sick and hospitalised. By the time, Ravi takes to warrant against Vijay and surrounds the hospital. As there is no other alternative, Vijay visits the temple and prays the god, the next day, when Shantamma recovers feels happy to know that her son has entered the temple for her. Thereafter, Vijay finds Anita is pregnant so, he decides to abandon from the underworld to marry her and also make confess for the forgiveness of his mother. Vijay informs his mother that he is coming to the temple as a reformed person but unfortunately, Anita is slaughtered by Bhujangam. In that rage, Vijay bursts out and kills Bhujangam. At last, in the final clash, Ravi pleads Vijay to surrender but he keeps trust in his badge and starts running. But his attempt fails as the badge slips and he is wounded to Ravi's bullet. Finally, Vijay reaches the temple and dies in his mother's lap and ultimately, Ravi is felicitated for pursuing justice.

Cast 
N. T. Rama Rao as Vijay Varma
Rama Krishna as Ravi Varma
Manjula as Anita
Latha as Geeta
Kanta Rao as Anand Babu
Prabhakar Reddy as Rambabu
Dhulipala as Police Commissioner
Rajanala
Mukkamala as Rahim
Dr. Sivaramakrishnaiah
Tyagaraju as Bhujangam
Raavi Kondala Rao
K. V. Chalam as Peter
Malladi
K. K. Sarma as Gangu
Anjali Devi as  Shanthamma
Radha Kumari
Baby Rohini
Jayamalini as item number

Soundtrack 

Music composed by K. V. Mahadevan. Lyrics were written by C. Narayana Reddy.

References

External links 

 

1970s action drama films
1970s Telugu-language films
1976 drama films
1976 films
Films scored by K. V. Mahadevan
Indian action drama films
1970s masala films
Telugu remakes of Hindi films
Films directed by S. D. Lal